Mandeure is a commune in the Doubs department in the Bourgogne-Franche-Comté region in eastern France.

History

Mandeure was a Roman town called Epomanduodurum. It reached its apogee in the 2nd century. The Roman theater was one of the largest in Gaul, measuring 142 m with four levels of seats that could seat 12,000 to 15,000 spectators. Free guided tours are available by contacting the mayor's office.

Population

See also
 Communes of the Doubs department

References

External links

 Mandeure on the intercommunal Web site of the department 
 Official Web site 

Communes of Doubs
Sequani